The GP Mario De Clercq is a cyclo-cross race held since 2000 in Ronse, Belgium with a break between 2004 and 2010. The track was drawn by former world champion Mario De Clercq, nameholder of this event and manager of Sunweb-Napoleon Games. From the 2011–2012 season to the 2017–2018 season, it was a part of the BPost Bank Trophy.

Past winners

Men

Women

References
 http://www.ronsekoerst.be/nl/home-1.htm

Cycle races in Belgium
Cyclo-cross races
Recurring sporting events established in 2000
2000 establishments in Belgium
Cyclo-cross BPost Bank Trophy
Ronse
Sport in East Flanders